Statistics of Qatar Stars League for the 1980–81 season.

Overview
Al-Sadd Sports Club won the championship.

References

Qatar - List of final tables (RSSSF)

1980–81 in Asian association football leagues
1980–81 in Qatari football